The Book of Treasure Maps is a supplement for fantasy role-playing games published by Judges Guild in 1979.

Contents
The Book of Treasure Maps contains five miniscenarios, each a dungeon that the player characters are led to via treasure map.  Each dungeon has a hand-drawn map for the players and a complete map for the GM.

The booklet contains five treasure maps plus accompanying scenarios and dungeon settings. These are set in the world on maps published by Judges Guild; however, they can be transferred intact into the gamemaster's own world. "The Lost Temple" is two levels of medium difficulty; "The Tomb of Aethering the Damned", one level; "The Lone Tower", a multi-level of slightly more difficulty; "Willchidar's Well", three small levels of medium difficulty; and "The Crypts of Arcadia", a large one-level maze about equal to "The Lone Tower".

Publication history
The Book of Treasure Maps was written by Jennell Jaquays, and was published by Judges Guild in 1979 as a 48-page book.

Reception
Elisabeth Barrington reviewed The Book of Treasure Maps in The Space Gamer No. 29. Barrington commented that "Each scenario comes with plenty of background information, accompanying rumors, maps for characters and the DM, and a wide variety of nasties. Well-written, it is easy to read and figure out. The maps appear in imaginative places - such as written in moon runes on a +1 shield - and are very clear. All five are easily placed anywhere the DM desired; he is not limited by the JG's own worlds. They are good for one campaign apiece, but if one wishes, they may be continued." She continued, "There is little to criticize about this book. The Book of Treasure Maps assumes a working knowledge of the D&D system, but that is about all." Barrington concludes her review by saying, The Book of Treasure Maps I recommend to almost any player who wished a good example of a one-night campaign set-up, whether he had his own campaign world or not; whether he had been playing two weeks or two years."

Patrick Amory reviewed Book of Treasure Maps for Different Worlds magazine and stated that "All of the dungeons are a lot of fun and well worked out, even in the small space available. This book probably gives the most value for the money of the Guild play-aids, each dungeon providing a good two hours of solid play."

Reviews
 Gryphon #2 (Fall 1980)
 Different Worlds #46 (May/June, 1987)

Notes

References

Judges Guild fantasy role-playing game supplements
Role-playing game supplements introduced in 1979